"Black Summer" is a song by American rock band Red Hot Chili Peppers and is the first single from their twelfth studio album, Unlimited Love. The single was released on February 4, 2022 and it was their first song in 16 years to feature guitarist John Frusciante, following his return to the band in 2019.

"Black Summer" quickly became a number-one single for the band on Alternative Airplay, giving them their 14th number-one single, a record for any artist on that chart, and 26th top ten single, second most for any artist on the Alternative Songs chart trailing only the Foo Fighters who have 28 top ten singles; it also gave the band a number-one single in four different decades on the Alternative Songs chart, tying them with Green Day for the most ever by an artist. "Black Summer" won the 2022 MTV Video Music Award for Best Rock Video.

Reception
The song received positive reviews from critics, although Kiedis' vocals drew confusion from critics, with some likening it to an Irish accent or pirate accent. Kiedis explained that the accent was a tribute to Welsh singer-songwriter Cate Le Bon, whom the band's former guitarist Josh Klinghoffer had recorded with on her fifth studio album, Reward, and performed with in the experimental musical collective Banana. Vulture praised the song, saying that it has "everything you'd want with a Chilis joint — ethereal riffs noodling along, wonderfully nonsensical lyrics, and a music video that has Anthony Kiedis disrobing at the midway point".

Frusciante's guitar work was particularly praised, and was likened to his work on the band's 2006 album Stadium Arcadium. Consequence lauded Frusciante's "signature guitar sound", noting that it "links perfectly with Flea’s energetic bass work and steps out for multiple solos. And not only that, Frusciante's anthemic backup vocals have returned, amplifying the song's chorus to create a wide screen, stadium worthy effect."

Producer Rick Rubin's return was also highlighted by Clash, who compared the single to the band's earlier work, with its "funky melodies and heavy rock weaved throughout".

Music video
A music video was released simultaneously with the single, directed by Deborah Chow.

The music video for "Black Summer" is nominated for a 2022 MTV Video Music Award for Best Rock Video. It marked the band's 29th nomination at the MTV Video Music Awards since 1990 and their first nomination since 2006 when they were nominated for "Dani California".

Live performances
The song made its live debut on April 1, 2022 on The Tonight Show Starring Jimmy Fallon and has been played at every show on the band's Global Stadium Tour.

Personnel
Red Hot Chili Peppers
Anthony Kiedis – lead vocals
Flea – bass guitar
Chad Smith – drums, tambourine
John Frusciante – guitar, backing vocals

Additional musicians
Matt Rollings – piano

Charts

Weekly charts

Year-end charts

Release history

References

2022 singles
2022 songs
Red Hot Chili Peppers songs
Songs written by Anthony Kiedis
Songs written by Flea (musician)
Songs written by Chad Smith
Songs written by John Frusciante
Warner Records singles